Atlantis Is Calling (S.O.S. for Love) is a song by German duo Modern Talking, released as the second single from their third studio album, Ready for Romance (1986). It is the duo's fifth and final consecutive single to reach No. 1 on the German Singles Chart. "Atlantis is Calling (S.O.S. for Love)" was released in Germany and in other European territories on 28 April 1986, it peaked at No. 1 in Germany on 16 June 1986 after spending two weeks at No. 2 position. The single spent four weeks at the top and total of 14 weeks on the top 100. While "Atlantis Is Calling (S.O.S. for Love)" entered the top five in Switzerland, Austria and Sweden, it managed to chart within the top 10 in the Netherlands and Norway.

Track listings
7-inch single (Hansa 108 239 1986)
"Atlantis Is Calling (S.O.S. for Love)"
"Atlantis Is Calling (S.O.S. for Love)" (Instrumental)

12-inch single (Hansa 608 239 1986)
"Atlantis Is Calling (S.O.S. for Love)" (Extended Version)
"Atlantis Is Calling (S.O.S. for Love)" (Instrumental)

Charts

Weekly charts

Year-end charts

Certifications

References

External links
 

Modern Talking songs
1986 singles
1986 songs
Ariola Records singles
Songs about Atlantis
Hansa Records singles
Number-one singles in Germany
Songs written by Dieter Bohlen